Charles Scribner III (January 26, 1890 – February 11, 1952), also known as Charles Scribner Jr., was president of Charles Scribner's Sons publishing company starting in 1932.

Biography
He was born on January 26, 1890, to Charles Scribner II. He graduated from Princeton University in 1913, then went to work for the Charles Scribner's Sons publishing company. He died on February 11, 1952.

References

1890 births
1952 deaths
Charles Scribner's Sons
Princeton University alumni